The Dyatlov Pass incident was an event in which nine Soviet hikers died in the northern Ural Mountains between February 1 and 2, 1959, in uncertain circumstances. The experienced trekking group from the Ural Polytechnical Institute, led by Igor Dyatlov, had established a camp on the eastern slopes of Kholat Syakhl in the Russian SFSR of the Soviet Union. Overnight, something caused them to cut their way out of their tent and flee the campsite while inadequately dressed for the heavy snowfall and sub-zero temperatures.

After the group's bodies were discovered, an investigation by Soviet authorities determined that six of them had died from hypothermia while the other three had been killed by physical trauma. One victim had major skull damage, two had severe chest trauma, and another had a small crack in his skull. Four of the bodies were found lying in running water in a creek, and three of these four had damaged soft tissue of the head and face two of the bodies had missing eyes, one had a missing tongue, and one had missing eyebrows. The investigation concluded that a "compelling natural force" had caused the deaths. Numerous theories have been put forward to account for the unexplained deaths, including animal attacks, hypothermia, an avalanche, katabatic winds, infrasound-induced panic, military involvement, or some combination of these factors.

Russia opened a new investigation into the incident in 2019, and its conclusions were presented in July 2020: that an avalanche had led to the deaths. Survivors of the avalanche had been forced to suddenly leave their camp in low-visibility conditions with inadequate clothing, and had died of hypothermia. Andrey Kuryakov, deputy head of the regional prosecutor's office, said: "It was a heroic struggle. There was no panic. But they had no chance to save themselves under the circumstances." A study led by scientists from EPFL and ETH Zürich, published in 2021, suggested that a type of avalanche known as a slab avalanche could explain some of the trekkers' injuries.

A mountain pass in the area was later named "Dyatlov Pass" in memory of the group. In many languages, the incident is now referred to as the "Dyatlov Pass incident". A prominent rock outcrop in the area now serves as a memorial to the group.

Background 
In 1959, a group was formed for a skiing expedition across the northern Urals in Sverdlovsk Oblast, Soviet Union. According to Prosecutor Tempalov, documents that were found in the tent of the expedition suggest that the expedition was named for the 21st Congress of the Communist Party of the Soviet Union and was possibly dispatched by the local Komsomol organisation. Igor Dyatlov, a 23-year-old radio engineering student at the Ural Polytechnical Institute (now Ural Federal University), the leader, assembled a group of nine others for the trip, most of whom were fellow students and peers at the university. The initial group consisted of eight men and two women, but as noted below one member started the hike but later turned back due to health issues. Each member of the group was an experienced Grade II-hiker with ski tour experience and would be receiving Grade III certification upon their return. At the time, Grade III was the highest certification available in the Soviet Union and required candidates to traverse . The route was designed by Dyatlov's group to reach the far northern regions of Sverdlovsk Oblast and the upper-streams of the Lozva river. The route was approved by the Sverdlovsk city route commission. This was a division of the Sverdlovsk Committee of Physical Culture and Sport, and they confirmed the group of 10 people on January 8, 1959. This route, estimated as a Category III, was undertaken in February, the most difficult time to traverse.

On 23 January 1959, the Dyatlov group was issued their route book, which listed their course as following the No.5 trail. At that time, the Sverdlovsk City Committee of Physical Culture and Sport listed approval for 11 people. The 11th person listed was Semyon Zolotaryov, who was previously certified to go with another expedition of similar difficulty (the Sogrin expedition group). The Dyatlov group left the Sverdlovsk city (today Yekaterinburg) on the same day they received the route book.

Expedition 

The group arrived by train at Ivdel, a town at the centre of the northern province of Sverdlovsk Oblast in the early morning hours of January 25, 1959. They then took a truck to Vizhai, a lorry village that is the last inhabited settlement to the north. While spending the night in Vizhai, the skiers purchased and ate loaves of bread to keep their energy levels up for the following day's hike.

On January 27, they began their trek toward Gora Otorten. On January 28, one member, Yuri Yudin, who had several health ailments (including rheumatism and a congenital heart defect) turned back due to knee and joint pain that made him unable to continue the hike. The remaining nine hikers continued the trek.

Diaries and cameras found around their last campsite made it possible to track the group's route up to the day preceding the incident. On 31 January, the group arrived at the edge of a highland area and began to prepare for climbing. In a wooded valley, they cached surplus food and equipment that would be used for the trip back. The next day, the hikers started to move through the pass. It seems they planned to get over the pass and make camp for the next night on the opposite side, but because of worsening weather conditions—snowstorms and decreasing visibility—they lost their direction and deviated west, toward the top of Kholat Syakhl. When they realised their mistake, the group decided to set up camp there on the slope of the mountain, rather than move  downhill to a forested area that would have offered some shelter from the weather. Yudin speculated, "Dyatlov probably did not want to lose the altitude they had gained, or he decided to practice camping on the mountain slope."

Search and discovery 
Before leaving, Dyatlov had agreed he would send a telegram to their sports club as soon as the group returned to Vizhai. It was expected that this would happen no later than 12 February, but Dyatlov had told Yudin, before he departed from the group, that he expected it to be longer. When the 12th passed and no messages had been received, there was no immediate reaction, as delays of a few days were common with such expeditions. On 20 February, the travellers' relatives demanded a rescue operation, and the head of the institute sent the first rescue groups, consisting of volunteer students and teachers. Later, the army and militsiya (police) forces became involved, with planes and helicopters ordered to join the operation.

On 26 February, the searchers found the group's abandoned and badly damaged tent on Kholat Syakhl. The campsite baffled the search party. Mikhail Sharavin, the student who found the tent, said "the tent was half torn down and covered with snow. It was empty, and all the group's belongings and shoes had been left behind." Investigators said the tent had been cut open from inside. Nine sets of footprints, left by people wearing only socks or a single shoe or even barefoot, could be followed, leading down to the edge of a nearby wood, on the opposite side of the pass,  to the north-east. After  these tracks were covered with snow. At the forest's edge, under a large Siberian pine, the searchers found the visible remains of a small fire. There were the first two bodies, those of Krivonischenko and Doroshenko, shoeless and dressed only in underwear. The branches on the tree were broken up to five meters high, suggesting that one of the skiers had climbed up to look for something, perhaps the camp. Between the pine and the camp, the searchers found three more corpses: Dyatlov, Kolmogorova, and Slobodin, who died in poses suggesting that they were attempting to return to the tent.

Finding the remaining four travelers took more than two months. They were finally found on 4 May under  of snow in a ravine  further into the woods from the pine tree. Three of the four were better dressed than the others, and there were signs that some clothing of those who had died first had been removed for use by the others. Dubinina was wearing Krivonishenko's burned, torn trousers, and her left foot and shin were wrapped in a torn jacket.

Investigation 

A legal inquest started immediately after the first five bodies were found. A medical examination found no injuries that might have led to their deaths, and it was concluded that they had all died of hypothermia. Slobodin had a small crack in his skull, but it was not thought to be a fatal wound.

An examination of the four bodies found in May shifted the narrative of the incident. Three of the hikers had fatal injuries: Thibeaux-Brignolles had major skull damage, and Dubinina and Zolotaryov had major chest fractures. According to Boris Vozrozhdenny, the force required to cause such damage would have been extremely high, comparable to that of a car crash. Notably, the bodies had no external wounds associated with the bone fractures, as if they had been subjected to a high level of pressure.

All four bodies found at the bottom of the creek in a running stream of water had soft tissue damage to their head and face. For example, Dubinina was missing her tongue, eyes, part of the lips, as well as facial tissue and a fragment of skullbone, while Zolotaryov had his eyeballs missing, and Aleksander Kolevatov his eyebrows. V. A. Vozrozhdenny, the forensic expert performing the post-mortem examination, judged that these injuries happened post-mortem due to the location of the bodies in a stream.

There was initial speculation that the indigenous Mansi people, reindeer herders local to the area, had attacked and murdered the group for encroaching upon their lands. Several Mansi were interrogated, but the investigation indicated that the nature of the deaths did not support this hypothesis: only the hikers' footprints were visible, and they showed no sign of hand-to-hand struggle.

Some had only one shoe, while others wore only socks. Some were found wrapped in snips of ripped clothes that seemed to have been cut from those who were already dead.

Journalists reporting on the available parts of the inquest files claim that it states:
 Six of the group members died of hypothermia and three of fatal injuries.
 There were no indications of other people nearby on Kholat Syakhl apart from the nine travelers.
 The tent had been ripped open from within.
 The victims had died six to eight hours after their last meal.
 Traces from the camp showed that all group members left the campsite of their own accord, on foot.
 Some levels of radiation were found on one victim's clothing.
 To dispel the theory of an attack by the indigenous Mansi people, Vozrozhdenny stated that the fatal injuries of the three bodies could not have been caused by human beings, "because the force of the blows had been too strong and no soft tissue had been damaged".
 Released documents contained no information about the condition of the skiers' internal organs.
 There were no survivors.

At the time, the official conclusion was that the group members had died because of a compelling natural force. The inquest officially ceased in May 1959 as a result of the absence of a guilty party. The files were sent to a secret archive.

In 1997, it was revealed that the negatives from Krivonischenko's camera were kept in the private archive of one of the investigators, Lev Ivanov. The film material was donated by Ivanov's daughter to the Dyatlov Foundation. The diaries of the hiking party fell into Russia's public domain in 2009.

On 12 April 2018, Zolotarev's remains were exhumed on the initiative of journalists of the Russian tabloid newspaper Komsomolskaya Pravda. Contradictory results were obtained: one of the experts said that the character of the injuries resembled a person knocked down by a car, and the DNA analysis did not reveal any similarity to the DNA of living relatives. In addition, it turned out that Zolotarev's name was not on the list of those buried at the Ivanovskoye Cemetery. Nevertheless, the reconstruction of the face from the exhumed skull matched postwar photographs of Zolotarev, although journalists expressed suspicions that another person was hiding under Zolotarev's name after World War II.

In February 2019, Russian authorities reopened the investigation into the incident, although only three possible explanations were being considered: an avalanche, a slab avalanche, or a hurricane. The possibility of a crime had been discounted.

Related reports 
 Yury Kuntsevich, who was 12 years old at the time and who later became the head of the Yekaterinburg-based Dyatlov Foundation, attended five of the hikers' funerals. He recalled that their skin had a "deep brown tan".
Similar spheres were observed in Ivdel and adjacent areas continually during the period from February to March 1959, by various independent witnesses (including the meteorology service and the military). These sightings were not noted in the 1959 investigation, and the various witnesses came forward years later.

Aftermath 

Anatoly Gushchin summarized his research in the book The Price of State Secrets Is Nine Lives (Sverdlovsk, 1990) Some researchers criticised the work for its concentration on the speculative theory of a Soviet secret weapon experiment, but its publication led to public discussion, stimulated by interest in the paranormal. Indeed, many of those who had remained silent for thirty years reported new facts about the accident. One of them was the former police officer, Lev Ivanov, who led the official inquest in 1959. In 1990, he published an article that included his admission that the investigation team had no rational explanation for the incident. He also stated that, after his team reported that they had seen flying spheres, he then received direct orders from high-ranking regional officials to dismiss this claim.

In 2000, a regional television company produced the documentary film The Mystery of Dyatlov Pass. With the help of the film crew, a Yekaterinburg writer, Anna Matveyeva, published a docudrama novella of the same name. A large part of the book includes broad quotations from the official case, diaries of victims, interviews with searchers and other documentaries collected by the film-makers. The narrative line of the book details the everyday life and thoughts of a modern woman (an alter ego of the author herself) who attempts to resolve the case. Despite its fictional narrative, Matveyeva's book remains the largest source of documentary materials ever made available to the public regarding the incident. Also, the pages of the case files and other documentaries (in photocopies and transcripts) are gradually being published on a web forum for enthusiastic researchers.

The Dyatlov Foundation was founded in 1999 at Yekaterinburg, with the help of Ural State Technical University, led by Yuri Kuntsevitch. The foundation's stated aim is to continue investigation of the case and to maintain the Dyatlov Museum to preserve the memory of the dead hikers. On 1 July 2016, a memorial plaque was inaugurated in Solikamsk in Ural's Perm Region, dedicated to Yuri Yudin (the sole survivor of the expedition group), who died in 2013.

Explanations

Avalanche 
On 11 July 2020, Andrey Kuryakov, deputy head of the Urals Federal District directorate of the Prosecutor-General's Office, announced an avalanche to be the "official cause of death" for the Dyatlov group in 1959. Later independent computer simulation and analysis by Swiss researchers also suggest avalanche as the cause. Summarizing Kuryakov's report in The New Yorker, Douglas Preston writes,

Original explanation 
Reviewing a sensationalist "Yeti" hypothesis, American skeptic author Benjamin Radford suggests an avalanche as more plausible:

Contradictory evidence
Evidence contradicting the avalanche theory includes:
 The location of the incident did not have any obvious signs of an avalanche having taken place. An avalanche would have left certain patterns and debris distributed over a wide area. The bodies found within a month of the event were covered with a very shallow layer of snow and, had there been an avalanche of sufficient strength to sweep away the second party, these bodies would have been swept away as well; this would have caused more serious and different injuries in the process and would have damaged the tree line.
 Over 100 expeditions to the region had been held since the incident, and none of them ever reported conditions that might create an avalanche. A study of the area using up-to-date terrain-related physics revealed that the location was entirely unlikely for such an avalanche to have occurred. The "dangerous conditions" found in another nearby area (which had significantly steeper slopes and cornices) were observed in April and May when the snowfalls of winter were melting. During February, when the incident occurred, there were no such conditions.
 An analysis of the terrain and the slope showed that even if there could have been a very specific avalanche that found its way into the area, its path would have gone past the tent. The tent had collapsed from the side but not in a horizontal direction.
 Dyatlov was an experienced skier and the much older Zolotaryov was studying for his Master's Certificate in ski instruction and mountain hiking. Neither of these two men would have been likely to camp anywhere in the path of a potential avalanche.
 Footprint patterns leading away from the tent were inconsistent with someone, let alone a group of nine people, running in panic from either real or imagined danger. All the footprints leading away from the tent and towards the woods were consistent with individuals who were walking at a normal pace.

Repeated 2015 investigation 
A review of the 1959 investigation's evidence completed in 2015–2019 by experienced investigators from the Investigative Committee of the Russian Federation (ICRF) on request of the families confirmed the avalanche with several important details added. First of all, the ICRF investigators (one of them an experienced alpinist) confirmed that the weather on the night of the tragedy was very harsh, with wind speeds up to hurricane force, a snowstorm and temperatures reaching . These factors were not considered by the 1959 investigators who arrived at the scene of the accident three weeks later when the weather had much improved and any remains of the snow slide had settled and been covered with fresh snowfall. The harsh weather at the same time played a critical role in the events of the tragic night, which have been reconstructed as follows:
 On 1 February the group arrives at the Kholat Syakhl mountain and erects a large, nine-person tent on an open slope, without any natural barriers such as forests. On the day and a few preceding days, a heavy snowfall persisted, with strong wind and frost.
 The group traversing the slope and digging a tent site into the snow weakened the snow base. During the night the snowfield above the tent started to slide down slowly under the weight of the new snow, gradually pushing on the tent fabric, starting from the entrance. The group wakes up and starts evacuation in panic, with only some able to put on warm clothes. With the entrance blocked, the group escapes through a hole cut in the tent fabric and descends the slope to find a place perceived as safe from the avalanche only  down, at the forest border.
 Because some of the members have only incomplete clothing, the group splits. Two of the group, only in their underwear and pajamas, were found at the Siberian pine tree, near a fire pit. Their bodies were found first and confirmed to have died from hypothermia.
 Three hikers, including Dyatlov, attempted to climb back to the tent, possibly to get sleeping bags. They had better clothes than those at the fire pit, but still quite light and with inadequate footwear. Their bodies were found at various distances  from the campfire, in poses suggesting that they had fallen exhausted while trying to climb in deep snow in extremely cold weather.
 The remaining four, equipped with warm clothing and footwear, were trying to find or build a better camping place in the forest further down the slope. Their bodies were found  from the fireplace, under several meters of snow and with traumas indicating that they had fallen into a snow hole formed above a stream. These bodies were found only after two months.

According to the ICRF investigators, the factors contributing to the tragedy were extremely bad weather and lack of experience of the group leader in such conditions, which led to the selection of a dangerous camping place. After the snow slide, another mistake of the group was to split up, rather than building a temporary camp down in the forest and trying to survive through the night. Negligence of the 1959 investigators contributed to their report creating more questions than answers, as well as inspiring numerous alternative and conspiracy theories.

Support from 2021 model
In 2021, a team of physicists and engineers led by Alexander Puzrin and Johan Gaume published in Communications Earth & Environment a new model that demonstrated how even a relatively small slide of snow slab on the Kholat Syakhl slope could cause tent damage and injuries consistent with those suffered by the Dyatlov team.

Katabatic wind 
In 2019, a Swedish-Russian expedition was made to the site, and after investigations, they proposed that a violent katabatic wind was a plausible explanation for the incident. Katabatic winds are somewhat rare events and can be extremely violent. They were implicated in a 1978 case at Anaris Mountain in Sweden, where eight hikers were killed and one was severely injured. The topography of these locations was noted to be very similar according to the expedition.

A sudden katabatic wind would have made it impossible to remain in the tent, and the most rational course of action would have been for the hikers to cover the tent with snow and seek shelter behind the treeline. On top of the tent, there was also a torch left turned on, possibly left there intentionally so that the hikers could find their way back to the tent once the winds subsided. The expedition proposed that the group of hikers constructed two bivouac shelters, one of which collapsed, leaving four of the hikers buried with the severe injuries observed.

Infrasound 
Another hypothesis popularised by Donnie Eichar's 2013 book Dead Mountain is that wind going around Kholat Syakal created a Kármán vortex street, which can produce infrasound capable of inducing panic attacks in humans.

According to Eichar's theory, the infrasound generated by the wind as it passed over the top of the Holatchahl mountain was responsible for causing physical discomfort and mental distress in the hikers. Eichar claims that, because of their panic, the hikers were driven to leave the tent by whatever means necessary, and fled down the slope. By the time they were further down the hill, they would have been out of the infrasound's path and would have regained their composure, but in the darkness would have been unable to return to their shelter. The traumatic injuries suffered by three of the victims were the result of their stumbling over the edge of a ravine in the darkness and landing on the rocks at the bottom.

Military tests 
In one speculation, the campsite fell within the path of a Soviet parachute mine exercise. This theory alleges that the hikers, woken by loud explosions, fled the tent in a shoeless panic and found themselves unable to return for supply retrieval. After some members froze to death attempting to endure the bombardment, others commandeered their clothing only to be fatally injured by subsequent parachute mine concussions. There are indeed records of parachute mines being tested by the Soviet military in the area around the time the hikers were there. Parachute mines detonate while still in the air rather than upon striking the Earth's surface and produce signature injuries similar to those experienced by the hikers: heavy internal damage with relatively little external trauma. The theory coincides with reported sightings of glowing, orange orbs floating or falling in the sky within the general vicinity of the hikers and allegedly photographed by them, potentially military aircraft or descending parachute mines. This theory (among others) uses scavenging animals to explain Dubinina's injuries. Some speculate that the bodies were unnaturally manipulated, on the basis of characteristic livor mortis markings discovered during an autopsy, as well as burns to hair and skin. Photographs of the tent allegedly show that it was erected incorrectly, something the experienced hikers were unlikely to have done.

A similar theory alleges the testing of radiological weapons and is based partly on the discovery of radioactivity on some of the clothing as well as the descriptions of the bodies by relatives as having orange skin and grey hair. However, radioactive dispersal would have affected all, not just some, of the hikers and equipment, and the skin and hair discoloration can be explained by a natural process of mummification after three months of exposure to the cold and wind. The initial suppression by Soviet authorities of files describing the group's disappearance is sometimes mentioned as evidence of a cover-up, but the concealment of information about domestic incidents was standard procedure in the USSR and thus far from peculiar. And by the late 1980s, all Dyatlov files had been released in some manner.

Paradoxical undressing 
International Science Times posited that the hikers' deaths were caused by hypothermia, which can induce a behavior known as paradoxical undressing in which hypothermic subjects remove their clothes in response to perceived feelings of burning warmth. It is undisputed that six of the nine hikers died of hypothermia. However, others in the group appear to have acquired additional clothing (from those who had already died), which suggests that they were of a sound enough mind to try to add layers.

Other 
Keith McCloskey, who has researched the incident for many years and has appeared in several TV documentaries on the subject, traveled to the Dyatlov Pass in 2015 with Yury Kuntsevich of the Dyatlov Foundation and a group. At the Dyatlov Pass he noted:
 There were wide discrepancies in distances quoted between the two possible locations of the snow shelter where Dubinina, Kolevatov, Zolotarev, and Thibault-Brignolles were found. One location was approximately 80 to 100 meters from the pine tree where the bodies of Doroshenko and Krivonischenko were found and the other suggested location was so close to the tree that anyone in the snow shelter could have spoken to those at the tree without raising their voices to be heard. This second location also has a rock in the stream where Dubinina's body was found and is the more likely location of the two. However, the second suggested location of the two has a topography that is closer to the photos taken at the time of the search in 1959.
 The location of the tent near the ridge was found to be too close to the spur of the ridge for any significant build-up of snow to cause an avalanche. Furthermore, the prevailing wind blowing over the ridge had the effect of blowing snow away from the edge of the ridge on the side where the tent was. This further reduced any build-up of snow to cause an avalanche. This aspect of the lack of snow on the top and near the top of the ridge was pointed out by Sergey Sogrin in 2010.
McCloskey also noted:
 Lev Ivanov's boss, Evgeny Okishev (Deputy Head of the Investigative Department of the Sverdlovsk Oblast Prosecution Office), was still alive in 2015 and had given an interview to former Kemerovo prosecutor Leonid Proshkin in which Okishev stated that he was arranging another trip to the Pass to fully investigate the strange deaths of the last four bodies when Deputy Prosecutor General Urakov arrived from Moscow and ordered the case shut down.
 Evgeny Okishev also stated in his interview with Leonid Proshkin that Klinov, head of the Sverdlovsk Prosecutor's Office, was present at the first post mortems in the morgue and spent three days there, something Okishev regarded as highly unusual and the only time, in his experience, it had happened.

Donnie Eichar, who investigated and made a documentary about the incident, evaluated several other theories that are deemed unlikely or have been discredited:
 They were attacked by Mansi or other local tribesmen.
The local tribesmen were known to be peaceful and there was no track evidence of anyone approaching the tent.
 They were attacked and chased by animal wildlife.
There were no animal tracks and the group would not have abandoned the relative security of the tent.
 High winds blew one member away, and the others attempted to rescue the person.
A large experienced group would not have behaved like that, and winds strong enough to blow away people with such force would have also blown away the tent.
 An argument, possibly related to a romantic encounter that left some of them only partially clothed, led to a violent dispute.
About this, Eichar states that it is "highly implausible. By all indications, the group was largely harmonious, and sexual tension was confined to platonic flirtation and crushes. There were no drugs present and the only alcohol was a small flask of medicinal alcohol, found intact at the scene. The group had even sworn off cigarettes for the expedition." Furthermore, a fight could not have left the massive injuries that one body had suffered.

Amateur aviation historian Andrey Shepelev considers that the group could die due to a photoflash bomb dropped by a US spy plane, and a declassified US document confirms that, in the first half of 1959, there was such a secret mission near Nizhnyaya Salda. According to Shepelev, the US plane could drop a photoflash bomb, which, due to the mountainous area, exploded closer to the ground than expected. The explosion could frighten the hikers, so they left the tent and froze to death. Some of the hikers could be injured directly by the explosion.

In popular culture 
 Popular interest in the Dyatlov Pass incident in Russia was revived in the 1990s in the wake of Anatoly Gushchin's 1990 novel, The Price of State Secrets Is Nine Lives ("").
 The incident figures prominently in the 2012 novel City of Exiles by Alec Nevala-Lee.
 The Dyatlov Pass Incident ( Devil's Pass), a film directed by Renny Harlin, was released on 28 February 2013 in Russia and 23 August 2013 in the U.S. It follows five American students retracing the steps of the victims, but, being a work of fiction, makes several changes in describing the initial events, e.g., inverting names of victims.
 Russia's Mystery Files: Episode 2 – The Dyatlov Pass Incident, 28 November 2014, National Geographic.
 In 2014, a Discovery Channel special "Russian Yeti: The Killer Lives" purported to examine the incident in relation to the myth of the Yeti.
 In 2015, Russian band Kauan released the album Sorni Nai which attempts to reconstruct the events that led up to the incident.
 The 2015 Polish horror video game Kholat is inspired by the Dead Mountain incident, in which the player goes to Dyatlov Pass in order to trace the steps of the lost expedition, and begins to uncover "the true cause" of the hikers' deaths.
 The 2020 Russian mini-series Dead Mountain – The Dyatlov Pass Incident follows the investigations of Oleg, a fictionalized KGB Major who in 1959 sets out to uncover the truth of what happened.
 The 2021 American documentary film An Unknown Compelling Force centers around information and theories surrounding the Dyatlov Pass incident, featuring interviews with Russian journalists, friends of the hikers and Yudin.

See also 
 Chivruay Pass incident, a lesser known tragedy occurring in 1973, also involving a group of explorers mysteriously dying in the Russian wilderness during the Soviet era
 Hamar-Daban pass incident, a lesser known tragedy occurring in 1993, also involving a group of explorers mysteriously dying in the Russian wilderness
 Yuba County Five, known as the "American Dyatlov Pass", a 1978 tragedy in which five men mysteriously died or disappeared on their way back from a basketball game in Yuba County, California
 List of unsolved deaths

Notes

References

Works cited

Further reading 
 Irina Lobatcheva, Vladislav Lobatchev, Amanda Bosworth (2013). Dyatlov Pass Keeps Its Secret. Parallel Worlds' Books 
 Svetlana Oss (2015). Don't Go There: The Mystery of Dyatlov Pass. CreateSpace

External links 

 Full investigation of the case including original documents, autopsy reports, morgue photos and detailed information on possible causes
 Map of the Dyatlov Pass region (sheet P-40-83,84) scale 1:100000 
 Deathly Urals location draws in tourists
 Complete photo gallery including search party photos 
 Some photos and text  
 Photo gallery including: party photos, photos of some investigator's documents including termination of criminal case act 
 The Dyatlov Pass Accident
 Photo-video site with English
 Atlas Obscura article on the Dyatlov Pass Incident
 Death on the trail. Controlled delivery theory by A. Rakitin 
 The DNA mystery 
 The Documentary Podcast: The Dyatlov Pass mystery (BBC World Service, 14 July 2019)
Revisited: how a Disney movie helped solve a decades-old mystery (Guardian podcast, 7 March 2021)

1959 in Russia
February 1959 events in Europe
Mountaineering disasters
Sport deaths in the Soviet Union
Unsolved deaths
1959 disasters in the Soviet Union
Ural Federal University